Friends for Christmas is a collaborative Christmas album by John Farnham and Olivia Newton-John. It was recorded at Playback Recording Studio in Santa Barbara, California, produced by Farnham's long-time music director Chong Lim, and released through Sony Music Australia on 11 November 2016 on CD and digital download. The album features well-known traditional holiday standards, by mostly American composers. It was re-released in 2017 with three additional tracks. Friends for Christmas was the final studio album released during Olivia Newton-John's lifetime.

Synopsis
Friends for Christmas is Farnham's first Christmas album in 46 years; when billed as "Johnny" he released the album Christmas Is Johnny Farnham in 1970. It is Newton-John's fourth, the most recent being This Christmas (2012) recorded with her Grease co-star, John Travolta. Farnham and Newton-John promoted the album in Australia in November.

Artists' press statements
Farnham said: "I have always loved working with Olivia. To record a Christmas album seemed like the right, almost inevitable thing to do. I hope everyone enjoys listening to it as much as we loved recording it together." Newton-John said: "It was such a joy singing these beautiful holiday songs with my favourite singer and good mate John Farnham. The holidays are about family and friends and having this chance to sing these classics with John was pure fun from beginning to end!"

John Farnham and Olivia Newton-John have performed together in concert numerous times, and have released two ARIA number-one albums: Highlights from The Main Event in 1998, from The Main Event Tour, also featuring Anthony Warlow and more recently Two Strong Hearts Live in 2015.

Critical reception
Cameron Adams and Mikey Cahill from news.com.au gave the album three-and-a-half stars out of five and said: "In a sea of corporate Christmas albums, this has a welcome quality missing from most: authenticity. First, they’re actual friends and Farnsey insisted on them recording together, eye-to-eye." They added: "Everything here is turned into a duet (and) producer Chong Lim hasn’t done much except capture the voices and add choirs and orchestration to make it as lush as you’d expect."

Samantha Jonscher from The Music gave the album two-and-a-half out of five, writing: "If you are the music programmer for David Jones this Christmas season then this is the Yuletide album for you. The Broadway smiles one imagines plastered across their faces may not be contagious, but the "cheer" will certainly be heard over even the most frantic Christmas eve shopper's pounding, desperate heartbeat."

Chart performance
Friends for Christmas debuted a number 3 on the Australian Albums Chart and reached number 1 in its fifth week of charting on 19 December 2016. It became the tenth chart topper for Farnham and the fifth for Newton-John. The Australian Recording Industry Association (ARIA) ranked the album sixth and 22th on its 2016 and 2017 year-end chart, respectively. Also in 2017, Friends for Christmas was certified double platinum in Australia. The album returned to the Australian Top 10 in December 2017 and again in 2018.

Track listing 
All tracks produced by Chong Lim.

Charts

Weekly charts

Year-end charts

Decade-end charts

Certifications

Release history

See also
 List of number-one albums of 2016 (Australia)

References

2016 Christmas albums
Christmas albums by Australian artists
Collaborative albums
John Farnham albums
Olivia Newton-John albums
Pop Christmas albums
Sony Music Australia albums